Västervik Municipality (Swedish: Västerviks kommun) is a municipality in Kalmar County, south-eastern Sweden, with its seat in the city of Västervik.

The present municipality was created in 1971, when the former City of Västervik was amalgamated with eight surrounding rural municipalities.

Localities

There are 11 urban areas (also called localities, Swedish: tätorter) in Västervik Municipality.

In the table the localities are listed according to the size of the population as of December 31, 2005. The municipal seat is in bold characters.

Government and politics
Distribution of the 57 seats in the municipal council after the 2010 election:

Moderate Party   21
Social Democratic Party   21
Centre Party   4
Green Party   2
Liberal People's Party   2
Left Party   2
Sweden Democrats   2
Socialisterna   1
Kommunpartiet VDM   1
Christian Democrats   1

Results of the 2010 Swedish general election in Västervik:

Social Democratic Party   39.9%
Moderate Party   25.8%
Centre Party   7.3%
Liberal People's Party   5.5%
Green Party   5.4%
Sweden Democrats   5.2%
Left Party   5.1%
Christian Democrats   4.7%

International relations

Twin towns — Sister cities
The municipality is twinned with:

References
Statistics Sweden

External links

Västervik Municipality - Official site
Västervik Tourism Official site - In Swedish, English and German
 Article Västervik in Nordisk Familjebok
Coat of arms

Municipalities of Kalmar County
Småland